Paul Sacher (28 April 190626 May 1999) was a Swiss conductor, patron and billionaire businessperson. At the time of his death Sacher was majority shareholder of pharmaceutical company Hoffmann-La Roche and was considered the third richest person in the world with an estimated net worth of US$13 billion.

He founded and conducted the Basler Kammerorchester (1926–1987). He commissioned notable works of composers of the 20th century and premiered them with the chamber orchestra. While better known for his interest in new music, he was also devoted to music of baroque and classical eras; he founded the Schola Cantorum Basiliensis, institute for early music, in 1933.

Biography
Sacher studied under Felix Weingartner, among others. In 1926 he founded the chamber orchestra Basler Kammerorchester, which specialized in both modern (twentieth-century) and pre-classical (mid-eighteenth-century) repertory. In 1928 he founded the Basel Chamber Choir. Both the orchestra and choir gave their last performance in 1987. In 1984, the Serenata Basel was formed, with no direct connection to Sacher. They later adopted the name Kammerorchester Basel. He also founded the Collegium Musicum Zürich in 1941 with Walter Schulthess and Stefi Geyer which he conducted until its disbandment in 1992.

Personal life
He was considered the world's third-richest man of the 1990s after marrying the heiress of the pharmaceutical company Hoffmann-La Roche. At the time of his death, he was reputed in various publications to be the richest man in Europe. He died in 1999, aged 93.

Sacher had 3 children. 
Two of those kept their last name of Countess of Faber-Castell, his only son carries the last name of Schmid.

Commissions
Immensely wealthy, Sacher commissioned works from many well-known composers, including:
Igor Stravinsky (who provided him with the Concerto in D)
Béla Bartók (Divertimento for Strings, the Sonata for Two Pianos and Percussion, the String Quartet No. 6 and the Music for Strings, Percussion and Celesta)
Bohuslav Martinů (many works including the Double Concerto for Two String Orchestras, Piano, and Timpani, Concerto da camera, etc.)
Arthur Honegger (many works, including his Second and  Fourth Symphony (Deliciae Basilienses)
Frank Martin (six works, including the Petite Symphonie Concertante)
Paul Hindemith
Hans Werner Henze
Richard Strauss
Elliott Carter
Witold Lutosławski (Sacher-Variationen, Double Concerto, Chain II)
Henri Dutilleux (Trois strophes sur le nom de Sacher and Mystère de l'instant)
Harrison Birtwistle

Pierre Boulez wrote his Grawemeyer Award-winning work Sur Incises for Sacher's 90th birthday.  Boulez bequeathed his entire catalogue (including drafts) to the Paul Sacher Foundation. Henze dedicated his Tenth Symphony to Sacher's memory, who had commissioned it but died before its completion.

In 1983, Sacher acquired the Stravinsky estate. The Paul Sacher Stiftung (Foundation) is located in the centre of Basel (in Münsterplatz) and houses one of the world's most important musical-manuscript collections. Sacher bought most of these manuscripts himself, and they include complete collections by several important twentieth-century composers (including Lutosławski, Ligeti, Boulez and Reich). In 1997, he received an honorary doctorate from the Academy of Music in Kraków.

Perhaps his finest recorded performance was preserved on mid-1950s late mono Columbia LP, Johann Christian Bach's Symphony in D major, Op. 18, No. 4, distinguished by its overall serenity, stylishness and smooth flow but also by his taking BOTH repeats (including the second long one, apparently never since taken in later recordings) of the rondo finale quintessentially representative of Johann Christian's serene melding of pre-classical galant (in the opening and closing rondo theme) and sensitive styles (in the canonic middle episode in D minor).

"eSACHERe"

On the occasion of Sacher's 70th birthday, twelve composer-friends of his (Conrad Beck, Luciano Berio, Pierre Boulez, Benjamin Britten, Henri Dutilleux, Wolfgang Fortner, Alberto Ginastera, Cristóbal Halffter, Hans Werner Henze, Heinz Holliger, Klaus Huber and Witold Lutosławski) were asked by Russian cellist Mstislav Rostropovich to write compositions for cello solo using his name spelled out in musical notes (musical cryptogram) as the theme (eS, A, C, H, E, Re). Many of them were performed in a Zurich concert on 2 May 1976. The whole "eSACHERe" project was performed in its entirety for the first time by Czech cellist František Brikcius on 9 May 2011 in Prague.

References

Links
Paul Sacher Foundation site
BBC feature
Project "say here"

1906 births
1999 deaths
20th-century conductors (music)
20th-century male musicians
20th-century philanthropists
Businesspeople from Basel-Stadt
Swiss conductors (music)
Male conductors (music)
Honorary Members of the Royal Philharmonic Society
Swiss philanthropists
Swiss patrons of music